Leinwand may refer to:

Goldene Leinwand, a German film award
Leslie Leinwand, American biologist and entrepreneur